The 1999 Great American Bash was the ninth Great American Bash professional wrestling pay-per-view (PPV) event produced by World Championship Wrestling (WCW), and 13th Great American Bash event overall. It took place on June 13, 1999, at the Baltimore Arena in Baltimore, Maryland. This was the seventh Great American Bash held at this venue after the 1988, 1989, 1990, 1991, 1996, and 1998 events. This was also the first PPV event to incorporate WCW's new logo that debuted two months prior.

Production

Background
The Great American Bash is a professional wrestling event established in 1985. It was first produced by the National Wrestling Alliance's (NWA) Jim Crockett Promotions (JCP) and aired on closed-circuit television before becoming a pay-per-view (PPV) event in 1988; JCP was rebranded as World Championship Wrestling (WCW) later that same year. WCW then seceded from the NWA in 1991. The 1999 event was the ninth Great American Bash event promoted by WCW and 13th overall. It took place on June 13, 1999, at the Baltimore Arena in Baltimore, Maryland. This was the seventh Great American Bash held at this venue after the 1988, 1989, 1990, 1991, 1996, and 1998 events. This was also the first PPV event to incorporate WCW's new logo that debuted three months prior.

Storylines
The event featured professional wrestling matches that involve different wrestlers from pre-existing scripted feuds and storylines. Professional wrestlers portray villains, heroes, or less distinguishable characters in the scripted events that build tension and culminate in a wrestling match or series of matches.

Event

Hak pinned Brian Knobs after Jimmy Hart accidentally hit Knobs with a steel chair. Knobs was then hit with a kendo stick by Hak. After the match, Hugh Morrus came out and attacked Hak. Roddy Piper was disqualified when Buff Bagwell came out and attacked Ric Flair; as per a prematch stipulation Flair regained the presidency of WCW that he had lost to Piper at Slamboree the previous month. After the match, Piper helped Flair and Arn Anderson to attack Bagwell. Rick Steiner won the match after Sting was attacked backstage by dogs and Rick forced the referee to declare him the winner. Randy Savage was disqualified after Sid Vicious, making his surprise return to WCW, interfered and attacked Kevin Nash with a powerbomb.

Reception
In 2013, Dylan Diot of 411Mania gave the event a rating of 3.0 [Bad], stating, "WCW was in a bad place at the time. They were becoming a cheap rip-off of both WWF and even ECW and they were going nowhere fast. The booking of the show was horrendous, seven [of] the matches involved interference and there were some mind-boggling stupid finishes throughout the show. Avoid this show at all costs, it's not worth it."

Results

References

Professional wrestling in Baltimore
Events in Baltimore
1999 in Maryland
1999
June 1999 events in the United States
1999 World Championship Wrestling pay-per-view events